Jack Emerson Davis is an author and professor of history in Florida. He holds the Rothman Family Endowed Chair in the Humanities and teaches environmental history and sustainability studies at the University of Florida. In 2002-2003, he taught on a Fulbright award at the University of Jordan in Amman, Jordan.

Davis received the 2018 Pulitzer Prize for History for his book The Gulf: The Making of an American Sea. He also wrote An Everglades Providence: Marjory Stoneman Douglas and the American Environmental Century, a dual biography of Marjory Stoneman Douglas and the Florida Everglades; and Race Against Time: Culture and Separation in Natchez since 1930. With Raymond Arsenault, he edited Paradise Lost?: The Environmental History of Florida, a collection of essays on the history of the human relationship with Florida nature.

Life 
Davis earned a BA (1985) and MA (1989) from the University of South Florida, and a Ph.D. in 1994 from Brandeis University. Before joining the University of Florida faculty, he taught at the University of Alabama at Birmingham, where he was director of environmental studies. He also taught at Eckerd College.

Race Against Time: Culture and Separation in Natchez Since 1930 won the Charles S. Sydnor Prize for the best book in southern history published in 2001. An Everglades Providence (2009), received the Florida Book Award gold medal in the nonfiction category. In addition to winning a Pulitzer Prize, The Gulf: The Making of an American Sea was awarded the 2017 Kirkus Prize in nonfiction and was a finalist for the National Book Critics Circle Award. The book covers the history of Gulf of Mexico from geological formation to the present (2016).

His other works include The Wide Brim: Early Poems and Ponderings of Marjory Stoneman Douglas (2002); Making Waves: Female Activists in Twentieth-Century Florida (2003), edited by Kari Frederickson and Davis; and The Civil Rights Movement (2000).

Works 
 The Bald Eagle: The Improbable Journey of America's Bird. W W Norton & Co Inc 2022 
 The Gulf: The Making of an American Sea. W W Norton & Co Inc 2018. , 
 An Everglades Providence: Marjory Stoneman Douglas and the American Environmental Century Athens : Univ Of Georgia Press, 2011. , 
 Race Against Time: Culture and Separation in Natchez since 1930. Baton Rouge, La. : Louisiana State University Press, 2001. , 
 The Wide Brim: Early Poems and Ponderings of Marjory Stoneman Douglas (Florida History and Culture) April 15, 2002;
 Making Waves: Female Activists in Twentieth-Century Florida Gainesville : University Press of Florida, 2003. , 
 The Civil Rights Movement  Malden (Mass.); Oxford : Blackwell, 2001. ,

Edited
 Raymond Arsenault (eds),  Paradise Lost?: The Environmental History of Florida, Gainesville: University Press of Florida, 2005. ,

References

Living people
21st-century American historians
American male non-fiction writers
Brandeis University alumni
University of Florida faculty
University of Alabama at Birmingham faculty
Year of birth missing (living people)
Eckerd College faculty
Kirkus Prize winners
21st-century American male writers